Eugène André Oudiné (1 January 1810, Paris – 12 April 1887, Paris) was a French sculptor and engraver of medals and coins, and devoted himself from the beginning to the medallist's branch of sculpture, although he also excelled in monumental sculpture and portrait busts.

Life

Having taken the Prix de Rome for engraving in 1831, he had a sensational success with his Wounded Gladiator, which he exhibited in the same year. 
He subsequently occupied official posts as designer, first to the Inland Revenue Office, and then to the Mint. Among his most famous medals are that struck in commemoration of the annexation of Savoy by France, and that on the occasion of the peace of Villafranca. 

Other remarkable pieces are The Apotheosis of Napoleon I, The Amnesty, Le Duc d'Orleans, Bertholet, The Universal Exposition, The Second of December, 1851, The Establishment of the Republic, The Battle of Inkermann, and Napoleon's Tomb at the Invalides. For the Hôtel de Ville, Paris he executed fourteen bas-reliefs, which were destroyed in 1871.

Of his monumental works, many are to be seen in public places in and near Paris. In the Tuileries gardens is his group of Daphnis and Hebe; in the Jardin du Luxembourg the Queen Bertha; at the Louvre the Buffon; and in the courtyard of the same palace the Bathsheba. A monument to General Espagne is at the Invalides, and a King Louis VIII at Versailles.

Oudine, who may be considered the father of the modern medal, died in Paris on 12 April 1887.

References

Attribution:

Further reading
 Eugène André Oudiné, In: Study photographs and reproductions of works of art with accompanying documentation 1920-2000, Frick Art Reference Library, 1920

External links

 

1810 births
1887 deaths
Chevaliers of the Légion d'honneur
Prix de Rome for engraving
19th-century French sculptors
French male sculptors
19th-century French male artists